Raymond Nu'u (born 28 April 1998) in a New Zealand rugby union player who plays for  in the National Provincial Championship (NPC). His playing position is centre.

Early life
Nu'u attended St Andrew's College in Christchurch. He played for Canterbury age-group sides before linking up with the Crusaders Academy. Nu'u moved to Invercargill in 2018.

Rugby career
He would go on to make 7 appearances in his maiden season.

Nu'u played a further two seasons for Southland, making 27 appearances overall for the Stags. Nu'u scored his first try against  on 14 September 2019; he would score another try against  on 10 October that same season.

Super Rugby statistics

Reference list

External links
Itsrugby.co.uk profile

New Zealand rugby union players
Living people
Rugby union centres
Otago rugby union players
Southland rugby union players
Rugby union players from Christchurch
1998 births
Melbourne Rebels players
New Zealand expatriate rugby union players
Expatriate rugby union players in Australia